Adventures of Joselito and Tom Thumb (Spanish: Aventuras de Joselito y Pulgarcito) is a 1960 Mexican-Spanish musical film directed by René Cardona and starring Joselito, Cesáreo Quezadas and Enrique Rambal.

Cast
 Joselito as himself  
 Cesáreo Quezadas as himself  
 Enrique Rambal 
 Óscar Ortiz de Pinedo 
 Anita Blanch 
 Nora Veryán 
 Arturo Castro 'Bigotón' 
 Guillermo Álvarez Bianchi 
 Alfredo Wally Barrón
 Florencio Castelló
 Manuel Capetillo
 Enrique García Álvarez

References

Bibliography 
 Bentley, Bernard. A Companion to Spanish Cinema. Boydell & Brewer, 2008.

External links 
 

1960 musical films
Spanish musical films
Mexican musical films
1960 films
1960s Spanish-language films
Films directed by René Cardona
1960s Spanish films
1960s Mexican films